Ermini is a surname. Notable people with the surname include:

 David Ermini (born 1959), Italian lawyer and politician
  (1900–1981), Italian politician and legal historian
 Pietro Ermini (1774–1850), Italian painter and engraver